Arthur-Joseph Lapointe (13 February 1895 – 5 January 1960) was a Liberal party member of the House of Commons of Canada. He was born in Saint-Ulric, Quebec in Matane County and became a railway station agent by career.

Lapointe was educated at seminary in Rimouski. He served in the military during World War I with postings at France and Belgium, attaining a rank of Lieutenant.

He was first elected to Parliament at the Matapédia—Matane riding in the 1935 general election and re-elected there in 1940. After completing his second term in the House of Commons, Lapointe did not seek another term in the 1945 federal election.

References

External links
 

1895 births
1960 deaths
Liberal Party of Canada MPs
Members of the House of Commons of Canada from Quebec
People from Bas-Saint-Laurent